Kutless is the debut album of Christian rock group, Kutless, released July 16th, 2002. The songs "Run" and "Your Touch" both reached No. 1 song on ChristianRock.net, and "Tonight" was in the Top 5. The album reached The Billboard Top Heatseekers Albums chart peaking at No. 48. The album also reached the Billboard Christian Albums chart peaking at No. 27.  It is the only Kutless album to feature bassist Nathan Stuart, who left the band shortly after its release.

Track listing

Personnel 

Kutless
 Jon Micah Sumrall – lead and backing vocals
 James Mead – rhythm guitar, backing vocals
 Ryan Shrout – lead guitar, backing vocals
 Nathan Stuart – bass guitar
 Kyle Mitchell – drums, percussion

Additional musicians
 Aaron Sprinkle – pianos, programming, loops, guitars 
 Phillip A. Peterson – cello 
 Ben Hulbert – rap (5)
 Danielle Capps – backing vocals (12)

Production
 Aaron Sprinkle – producer, engineer 
 Brandon Ebel – executive producer 
 J.R. McNeely – mixing at Hipposonic Studios
 Troy Glessner – mastering at Spectre Studio, Renton, Washington
 Asterik Studio – art direction, design, layout 
 Kris McCaddon – band photography 

Studios
 Recorded at Compound Recording, Seattle, Washington
 Piano recorded at Hipposonic Studios, Vancouver, B.C.
 Drums recorded at Spectre Studio, Tacoma, Washington

Music videos 

Three music videos were released for this album, the most of any Kutless album to date. The video for "Your Touch" consists of the band playing in an empty building and walking around the streets surrounding it. The video for "Tonight" includes many varied shots of the band on tour, from playing on stage to talking to fans to many other activities. Finally, the video for "Run" shows the band playing in a dark room while the video tells a story of a woman and a man who argue over a Bible that belongs to one of them, and it ends with the woman sitting down and reading the Bible. All three of these videos were included on various compilation DVDs, as well as the special edition DVD of Kutless' album Hearts of the Innocent.

Note: At 3:40, the music video of "Your Touch" is shorter than the album version of the song at 4:23.

References

Kutless albums
BEC Recordings albums
2002 debut albums
Albums produced by Aaron Sprinkle